Sutter County Airport  is a public airport located one mile (1.6 km) south of Yuba City, serving Sutter County, California, USA.

References

External links

Airports in California
Yuba City, California
Transportation in Sutter County, California

Buildings and structures in Sutter County, California